The women's pole vault at the 2021 World Athletics U20 Championships was held at the Kasarani Stadium on 18 August.

Records

Results

Final
The final was held on 18 August at 16:00.

References

pole vault
Pole vault at the World Athletics U20 Championships
U20